In the United States, 80/20 housing is multifamily housing program that meets federal guidelines for tax-exempt financing. As the United States continued to experience shortages in affordable housing, the 1986 Tax Reform Act, responsible for the creation of the Low Income Housing Tax Credit (LIHTC), was the first step towards a solution, encouraging the construction of rentals for lower-income households. Specifically, the 80/20 housing structure is effective in high-rent areas for which 80 percent of the buildings apartments are rented at typical market rate, while 20 percent are specific to low- and moderate-income Americans.  As far as who qualifies, State Housing Finance Agencies (HFAs) define low income as income below 80 percent of regional median income. 

This helps to insinuate diversified income projects while also allowing granting developers funds at lower interest rates. It is a national priority to provide low- and moderate-income families affordable housing, and through the 80/20 program developers can maximize public benefits, while still remaining fluid to changes in the market and financing structure.

According to these guidelines, 20 percent of units must be rented to low-income households.

References 

Public housing in the United States

Affordable housing